Battle of Khorramshahr may refer to two battles during the Iran–Iraq War:

Battle of Khorramshahr (1980), the capture of Khorramshahr by Iraqi forces
Battle of Khorramshahr (1982), the recapture of Khorramshahr by Iranian forces